The Human League Live at the Dome is a live album by British synthpop band The Human League recorded during a concert at the Brighton Dome, UK on 19 December 2003. It was released as an enhanced digipak CD in the UK on 18 July 2005 by Secret Records Limited (distributed by Snapper Music).

The album features singles and album tracks, spanning the years from their debut album release, 1979's Reproduction, to their most recent album, 2001's Secrets. Also included are three enhanced live video tracks.

A DVD also called Live at the Dome was released concurrently with the album, the DVD contains the full concert and bonus footage.

The cover artwork for both the album and DVD was by Stig Olsen

Track listing
"Medley Hard Times / Love Action (I Believe in Love)" - 8:21
"Mirror Man" - 4:27
"Louise" - 5:04
"The Snake" - 4:22
"Darkness" - 3:53
"All I Ever Wanted" - 4:03
"Open Your Heart" - 4:02
"The Lebanon" - 4:16
"Human" - 4:21
"The Things That Dreams Are Made Of" - 3:48
"(Keep Feeling) Fascination" - 4:01
"Don't You Want Me" - 3:59
"Together in Electric Dreams" - 4:48
"Mirror Man" (Enhanced Video) - 4:27
"Human" (Enhanced Video) - 4:21
"(Keep Feeling) Fascination" (Enhanced Video) - 4:01

References

External links
http://www.the-black-hit-of-space.dk/live_at_the_dome_alb.htm
Live at the Dome at Secret Records

The Human League albums
2005 live albums